Agustín Fabián Bindella (born 5 March 2001) is an Argentine professional footballer who plays as a defender for Quilmes.

Career
Bindella started his senior career with Primera B Nacional's Quilmes. Marcelo Fuentes promoted Bindella into their first-team set-up for a fixture with Villa Dálmine in October 2018, with the defender featuring for thirty-four minutes of a 1–1 home draw. On 1 March 2019, Bindella completed a loan move to Primera División side Independiente; initially linking up with their reserves. He returned to Quilmes at the end of the year.

Career statistics
.

References

External links

2001 births
Living people
People from Quilmes
Argentine footballers
Association football defenders
Primera Nacional players
Quilmes Atlético Club footballers
Club Atlético Independiente footballers
Sportspeople from Buenos Aires Province